The Kombai are a Papuan people living in the Indonesian province of South Papua, more specifically in Mappi Regency. Their total population is about 5,650.

Way of life

The Kombai people live in clans, each clan having its own territory in the Papuan forest. Certain areas of the forest are not inhabited, as they are supposed to be sacred lands meant for the spirits. Each clan has a large treehouse where male tribesmen sleep, while women sleep in small huts on the ground. This sacred treehouse is thought to act as a defense from enemy attacks, and is closely guarded by men with bows and arrows.

Like many other Papuan ethnic tribes, the Kombai people are hunter-gatherers. They hunt pigs and other forest animals, using small dogs to track down and kill their prey. For fishing, the Kombai build small dams in the stream and pour a poison from a toxic root into the water. This forces the fish to come to the surface, making them easy to catch. Cooking is done by heating stones under a fire, wrapping the meat in large leaves, and placing the hot stones on top until the meat is cooked.  As food is abundant in the forest, none is stored. 

The Kombai also eat the larvae of the capricorn beetle, called sago grub, which is considered a delicacy. To harvest these, the Kombai cut down a sago tree, leave it for a month, then wrap the tree in leaves and let it rot for three months. After this time has passed, they collect the larvae. This traditional food is used in festivities with neighbouring clans and tribes to strengthen social ties.

Documentaries

British adventurer and TV presenter Bruce Parry lived with the Kombai in season 1, episode 3 of his documentary series, Tribe (2005).

A television series on The Discovery Channel entitled "Living with the Kombai" in the US, and on both the National Geographic Channel and The Discovery Channel, named "World's Lost Tribes" in the United Kingdom, was shown in January 2007.  In the series, two men travelled to Papua and spent several months living with an extended Kombai family.  Their adventures included hunting for a large lizard and a wild pig, and fishing by constructing a rudimentary dam on a stream. They also helped chop down large trees with a stone axe, made sago from the sago palm tree, and used its fibres to build a treehouse nearly 80 feet off the ground.

The Kombai were also featured in the 2007 season of the series Mark & Olly: Living with the Tribes.

The Kombai people also appeared in "Going to Extremes" series 2: 'Surviving Extremes' (2003) in the Swamp episode.  The host "Nick Middleton" stays with the tribe and climbs the treehouses.

Finnish TV-show Madventures has done an episode involving Kombai and Korowai tribes in West-Papua at season 2 episode 6.

See also

Indigenous people of New Guinea

References

External links
World's Lost Tribes website
BBC: Kombai Tribe
Kombai language research, VU University Amsterdam

Ethnic groups in Indonesia
Indigenous ethnic groups in Western New Guinea
Headhunting in New Guinea